The following is a list of 2021 box office number-one films in Japan by week. When the number-one film in gross is not the same as the number-one film in admissions, both are listed.

Highest-grossing films

See also
List of Japanese films of 2021

References

2021
Japan
2021 in Japanese cinema